Lafayette station is a Bay Area Rapid Transit (BART) station in Lafayette, California. The station consists of one island platform in the center median of State Route 24 just south of the Lafayette Hillside Memorial.

History

Service at the station began on May 21, 1973. The fare lobby includes three columns covered in tile mosaics, which were designed by Helen Webber and constructed by Alfonso Pardiñas. Webber originally planned to use a purple background, but switched to blue due to local objections related to purple's association with the controversial People's Park.

In October 2011, BART was criticized for spending $2 million on a wheelchair ramp at the south entrance to the station without adding curb cuts or accessible parking there. However, the ramp was primarily built to connect to a path to the Lafayette business district to the south, and BART was already preparing to add curb cuts. The station was not accessible from April to July 2021 due to replacement of the hydraulic cylinder in the platform elevator.

Notes

External links 

BART - Lafayette

Bay Area Rapid Transit stations in Contra Costa County, California
Stations on the Yellow Line (BART)
Lafayette, California
Railway stations in the United States opened in 1973
1973 establishments in California